The Echo (1997) is the fifth crime novel written by award-winning British crime fiction author Minette Walters. Like all of her books, The Echo is a stand-alone (non-series) novel whose characters do not appear in any of her other books. Originally published in English, The Echo has been translated into nine other languages in print and recorded as an e-book in both English and German.

Synopsis
When a homeless man going by the name Billy Blake starves himself to death in the garage of socialite Amanda Powell, journalist Michael Deacon is sent to get the story. Questions abound about Deacon digs into the pasts of both Billy Blake and Amanda Powell: who is Billy Blake? Could he be Amanda's previously vanished husband? Why did he choose to starve himself in her garage and in full view of a freezer full of food? Why is Amanda so interested in Billy Blake, and why does she pay for his funeral? Along the investigative path, Deacon encounters an unusual cast of characters from Billy's past as well as his own.

Main characters 
 Amanda Powell
 Michael Deacon
 Billy Blake

Television adaptation
In 1998 this story was adapted for television by the BBC. The cast featured Clive Owen as Michael Deacon and Joely Richardson as Amanda. The show ran for one season.

External links 
More about The Echo on Walters' website

Notes 

1997 British novels
Novels by Minette Walters
Novels about journalists
Macmillan Publishers books